The year 1770 in architecture involved some significant events.

Buildings and structures

Buildings

 Radcliffe Infirmary in Oxford, England, designed by Stiff Leadbetter and John Sanderson, completed
 Shire Hall, Nottingham, England, designed by James Gandon and Joseph Pickford, completed
 New National Mint of Bolivia in Potosí completed
 Palace of Inquisition in Cartagena, Viceroyalty of New Granada, completed about this date
 Liria Palace in Madrid, designed by Ventura Rodríguez, built about this date
 Church of Our Lady of Mount Carmel, Rio de Janeiro, Brazil, probably designed by Manuel Alves Setúbal, consecrated
 Church of Santissimo Nome di Maria e degli Angeli Custodi, Genoa, begun in 1712, completed about this date
 Church of La Magdalena, Getafe, Spain, designed by Alonso de Covarrubias and Juan Gómez de Mora and begun in the 16th century, completed
 Wooden Saint Parascheva Church, Desești, Romania, built
 New Théâtre du Palais-Royal (rue Saint-Honoré), Paris, designed by Pierre-Louis Moreau-Desproux, opened
 New L'Opéra of the Palace of Versailles, France, designed by Ange-Jacques Gabriel, opened
 College Edifice, Brown University, Providence, Rhode Island, designed by Robert Smith of Philadelphia, built
 Somerset House, Park Lane, London, designed and built by John Phillips, completed
 Zois Mansion in Ljubljana, Slovenia, completed
 Summer residences in the Frederiksberg district of Copenhagen, Denmark, built about this date include
 Rolighed
 Store Godthåb, probably designed by Johan Christian Conradi
 Temple of Friendship in Sanssouci Park, Potsdam, Prussia, designed by Carl von Gontard, completed
 The Eryilou Fujian tulou in China is built
 Approximate date – Mesi Bridge in Ottoman Albania built

Births
 March 4 – Christian Zais, German architect and city planner (died 1820)
 1765/1770 – Fryderyk Bauman, Polish architect and sculptor-decorator (died 1845)
 Approximate date – Daniel Robertson, American-born British architect and garden designer (died 1849)

Deaths
 March 27 – José Ramírez de Arellano, Spanish baroque architect and sculptor (born 1705)
 John Bastard, English architect working in Blandford Forum (born c.1688)
 George Tully, English architect working in Bristol

References

Architecture
Years in architecture
18th-century architecture